Joseph Steere may refer to:

 Joseph Beal Steere (1842–1940), American ornithologist
 Joseph H. Steere (1852–1936), American jurist